Octomeria estrellensis is a species of orchid endemic to southeastern Brazil.

References

External links 

estrellensis
Endemic orchids of Brazil